Annona is a plant genus.

Annona may also refer to:

 Anonas station (Line 2), a train station in Quezon City, Philippines
 Annona, Texas, a settlement in Red River County, Texas
Annona (mythology), personification of the produce of the yearly harvest in ancient Roman religion
 The prefect of the annona, responsible for the grain supply to the city of Rome
 Annona (crater), in the southern hemisphere of the dwarf planet Ceres

See also

Antona (disambiguation)